The 1977 Davidson Wildcats football team represented Davidson College as a member of the Southern Conference during the 1977 NCAA Division I football season. Led by fourth-year head coach Ed Farrell, the Wildcats compiled an overall record of 4–6.

Schedule

References

Davidson
Davidson Wildcats football seasons
Davidson Wildcats football